Think of You may refer to:

 "Think of You" (Usher song), 1994
 "Think of You" (Whigfield song), 1995
 "Think of You" (Chris Young and Cassadee Pope song), 2016
 "Think of You", a song by MS MR from their 2013 album Secondhand Rapture